Anna-Lena Grönefeld and Martina Navratilova were the defending champions, but they decided not to compete with each other. Grönefeld participated with Cara Black, but the pair were defeated by Navratilova and Nadia Petrova in the final, 6–1, 6–2. This was Navratilova's 177th WTA doubles title, and was her final doubles title before her retirement later in 2006. Navratilova's 177 doubles titles is an Open Era record.

Seeds
The top four seeds received a bye into the second round.

Draw

Finals

Top half

Bottom half

External links 
 Draw and Qualifying Draw

Cup - Doubles